Euterpe (from  + ) was one of the Muses in Greek mythology, presiding over music. In late Classical times, she was named muse of lyric poetry. She has been called "Giver of delight" by ancient poets.

Mythology
Euterpe was born as one of the daughters of Mnemosyne, Titan goddess of memory, and fathered by Zeus, god of the gods. Her sisters include Calliope (muse of epic poetry), Clio (muse of history), Melpomene (muse of tragedy), Terpsichore (muse of dancing), Erato (muse of erotic poetry), Thalia (muse of comedy), Polyhymnia (muse of hymns), and Urania (muse of astronomy). Sometimes they are referred to as water nymphs having been born from the four sacred springs on Helicon which flowed from the ground after Pegasus, the winged horse, stamped his hooves on the ground. The mountain spring on Mount Parnassus was sacred to Euterpe and the other Muses. It flowed between two high rocks above the city of Delphi, and in ancient times its sacred waters were introduced into a square stone basin, where they were retained for the use of the Pythia, the priests, priestesses, as well as the oracle of Apollo.

Along with her sister Muses, Euterpe was believed to have lived on Mount Olympus where she and her sisters entertained their father and the other Olympian gods with their great artistry. Later on, tradition also placed them on Mount Helicon in Boeotia where there was a major cult center to the goddesses, or on Mount Parnassus where the Castalian spring was a favorite destination for poets and artists.

Some people believe that she invented the aulos or double-flute, though most mythographers credit Marsyas or Athena with its invention. Some say she also invented other wind instruments. Euterpe is often depicted holding a flute in artistic renditions of her.

Pindar and other sources (the author of the Bibliotheca, and Servius), describe the Thracian king Rhesus, who appears in the Iliad, as son of Euterpe and the river-god Strymon; Homer calls him son of Eioneus.

Functions
Euterpe's role, alongside her sisters, was to entertain the gods on Mount Olympus. She inspired the development of liberal and fine arts in Ancient Greece, serving as an inspiration to poets, dramatists, and authors such as Homer.

Traditionally, musicians would invoke Euterpe to inspire, guide and assist them in their compositions. Such petitions might take the form of a prayer for divine inspiration from the muse.

Gallery

See also 
 Muses in popular culture

Notes

References 
 Apollodorus, The Library with an English Translation by Sir James George Frazer, F.B.A., F.R.S. in 2 Volumes, Cambridge, MA, Harvard University Press; London, William Heinemann Ltd. 1921. ISBN 0-674-99135-4. Online version at the Perseus Digital Library. Greek text available from the same website.
 Euripides, The Rhesus of Euripides translated into English rhyming verse with explanatory notes by Gilbert Murray, LL.D., D.Litt, F.B.A., Regius Professor of Greek in the University of Oxford. Euripides. Gilbert Murray. New York. Oxford University Press. 1913. Online version at the Perseus Digital Library.
 Euripides, Euripidis Fabulae. vol. 3. Gilbert Murray. Oxford. Clarendon Press, Oxford. 1913. Greek text available at the Perseus Digital Library.
 Hesiod, Theogony from The Homeric Hymns and Homerica with an English Translation by Hugh G. Evelyn-White, Cambridge, MA.,Harvard University Press; London, William Heinemann Ltd. 1914. Online version at the Perseus Digital Library. Greek text available from the same website.
 Homer, The Iliad with an English Translation by A.T. Murray, Ph.D. in two volumes. Cambridge, MA., Harvard University Press; London, William Heinemann, Ltd. 1924. . Online version at the Perseus Digital Library.
Homer, Homeri Opera in five volumes. Oxford, Oxford University Press. 1920. . Greek text available at the Perseus Digital Library.
Maurus Servius Honoratus, In Vergilii carmina comentarii. Servii Grammatici qui feruntur in Vergilii carmina commentarii; recensuerunt Georgius Thilo et Hermannus Hagen. Georgius Thilo. Leipzig. B. G. Teubner. 1881. Online version at the Perseus Digital Library.

External links 

 EUTERPE from The Theoi Project
 Warburg Institute Iconographic Database (ca 50 images of Euterpe)

Greek Muses
Thraco-Macedonian mythology
Women of Apollo
Music in Greek mythology
Children of Zeus
Music and singing goddesses
Metamorphoses characters
Wisdom goddesses
Ancient Greek poetry